Lil Soldiers was a rap group signed to No Limit Records.

Discography

Studio albums

Compilation albums

Singles

As lead artist

See also
 No Limit Records
 No Limit Records discography
 Beats by the Pound

References

American hip hop groups
No Limit Records artists
Southern hip hop groups
Hip hop duos
American musical duos
African-American musical groups
Musical groups from New Orleans
Musical groups established in 1998
Musical groups disestablished in 1999